Pitts Neck, also known as Pitts Neck Farm, is a historic home located near New Church, Accomack County, Virginia. It consists of a two-story, five bay, brick main block connected to a -story, two-bay frame wing connected by a hyphen.  The wing dates to the beginning of the 18th century and the main block to about 25–30 years later. The main block has a central passage plan and is topped by a shallow gable roof. It features a scrolled soffit of its molded brick doorway.

It was added to the National Register of Historic Places in 1976.

References

External links

Pitts Neck Farm, State Route 709, New Church, Accomack County, VA: 3 photos at Historic American Buildings Survey

Historic American Buildings Survey in Virginia
Houses on the National Register of Historic Places in Virginia
Houses completed in 1700
National Register of Historic Places in Accomack County, Virginia
Houses in Accomack County, Virginia
1700 establishments in Virginia